Lopinae is a subfamily of kelp flies in the family Coelopidae.

Classification
Genus Lopa McAlpine, 1991

References

Coelopidae